Pseudocleopatra broecki is a species of freshwater snail with an operculum, an aquatic gastropod mollusc in the family Paludomidae.

This species is found in the Democratic Republic of the Congo.

Its natural habitat is rivers.

References

 Mandahl-Barth G. (1974). New or little known species of freshwater Mollusca from Zaire and Angola, with remarks on the genus Sierraia Connolly. Revue fe Zoologie Africaine. 88(1): 352–362.

External links
 Neiber, M. T.; Kahl, S. M.; Wiggering, B.; Glaubrecht, M. (2019). Adding the West-African riverine component: Revision of the Recent freshwater snails belonging to Pseudocleopatra Thiele, 1928 (Caenogastropoda, Cerithioidea, Paludomidae). Zootaxa. 4674(3): 301-328

Paludomidae
Gastropods described in 1899
Taxobox binomials not recognized by IUCN 
Endemic fauna of the Democratic Republic of the Congo